Euphorbia capuronii is a species of plant in the family Euphorbiaceae. It is endemic to Madagascar.  It is threatened by habitat loss.

The Latin specific epithet of capuronii is in honor of the French botanist René Capuron. It was first published in Mém. Inst. Sci. Madagascar, Sér. B, Biol. Vég. Vol.5 on page 170 (1954, publ. 1955).

References

Endemic flora of Madagascar
capuronii
Taxonomy articles created by Polbot
Plants described in 1955
Critically endangered flora of Africa